Sir Henry Josias Stracey, 5th Baronet (31 July 1802 – 7 August 1885) was a British Conservative Party politician.

He was a Member of Parliament for East Norfolk from 1855 to 1857, for Great Yarmouth from 1859 to 1865, and for Norwich from 1868 to 1869.

References

External links
 

1802 births
1885 deaths
Baronets in the Baronetage of the United Kingdom
Conservative Party (UK) MPs for English constituencies
UK MPs 1852–1857
UK MPs 1859–1865
UK MPs 1868–1874